Michel Delafosse (25 November 1943 – 9 July 2013) was a French footballer. He competed in the men's tournament at the 1968 Summer Olympics.

References

External links
 

1943 births
2013 deaths
French footballers
Olympic footballers of France
Footballers at the 1968 Summer Olympics
Footballers from Rouen
Mediterranean Games gold medalists for France
Mediterranean Games medalists in football
Association football defenders
Competitors at the 1967 Mediterranean Games